Barrientos is a Spanish surname. Notable people with the surname include:

Politicians and scholars 
René Barrientos (1919–1969), president of Bolivia from 1964 to 1966 and 1966 to 1969
Manuel Espino Barrientos (born 1959), president of the National Action Party (PAN) of Mexico
Gonzalo Barrientos (born 1941), Democratic member of the Texas Senate from 1985 to 2007
Lope de Barrientos (1382–1469), clergyman and statesman of the Spanish Crown of Castile
Baltasar Alamos de Barrientos (1555–1640), Spanish scholar
Simone Barrientos (born 1963), German politician

Sportspeople 
Claudio Barrientos (1936–1982), Chilean boxer
Felipe Barrientos (born 1984), Chilean handball player
Hamlet Barrientos (born 1978), Bolivian footballer
Hugo Barrientos (born 1977), Argentine footballer
José Barrientos (1904–1945), Cuban sprinter
Juan Manuel Barrientos (born 1982), Argentine footballer
Nicolás Barrientos (born 1987), Colombian tennis player
Pablo Barrientos (born 1985), Argentine footballer
Rafael Ernesto Barrientos (born 1979), Salvadoran footballer
Rene Barrientos (born 1943), Filipino boxer
Rudy Barrientos (born 1999), Guatemalan footballer
Yashira Barrientos (born 1994), Mexican footballer

Entertainment 
Adriana Barrientos, Chilean model, dancer and television personality
Maria Barrientos (1883–1946), Spanish opera singer
Mauricio Barrientos, Mexican actor
Jennifer Barrientos, Miss Universe pageant representative for the Philippines

Spanish-language surnames